The Accademia di Belle Arti di Catanzaro is an academy of fine arts located in Catanzaro, Italy. It was founded in 1972.

References

External links
 

Art schools in Italy
Education in Calabria
Catanzaro
Educational institutions established in 1972
1972 establishments in Italy